Bupleurum chinense (Chai Hu, Thorowax) is a plant of the family Apiaceae.

Distribution and appearance
Bupleurum chinense is native to East Asia. The leaves of the plant are long and thin and resemble fennel.

Use in traditional Chinese medicine
The root of B. chinense, known as Radix Bupleuri, is used in traditional Chinese medicine. Its proposed use is to strengthen the liver.

There is no good evidence that Chinese herbal medicines, including those derived from B. chinense, are of any benefit in treating fatty liver disease, and the safety of these drugs is unknown.

Chemical constituents
Bupleurum chinense roots, also known as Radix Bupleuri, contain polyacetylenes and saponins/triterpenoids.

References

chinense